A great house is a large house or mansion with luxurious appointments and great retinues of indoor and outdoor staff.  The term is used mainly historically, especially of properties at the turn of the 20th century, i.e., the late Victorian or Edwardian era in the United Kingdom and the Gilded Age in the United States.

Definition
There is no precise definition of "great house", and the understanding of varies between countries. In England, while most villages would have a manor house since time immemorial, originally home of the lord of the manor and sometimes referred to as "the big house", not all would have anything as lavish as a traditional English country house, one of the traditional markers of an established "county" family that derived at least a part of its income from landed property. Stately homes, even rarer and more expensive, were associated with the peerage, not the gentry. Many mansions were demolished in the 20th century; families that had previously split their time between their country house and their town house found the maintenance of both too expensive. Many properties are now open to the public as historic house museums, either run by their ancestral owners on a commercial basis, or having been given to English Heritage or similar organisations. Others operate as hotels and wedding venues. Some still serve as the family seat.

In Ireland, the term big house is usual for the houses of the Anglo-Irish ascendancy.

In the United States, great houses can be found on streets known informally as "millionaires' mile" (or "row") in certain cities.

In Jamaica, "great house" is the standard term for the house at the centre of plantation life, what in the United States is called a plantation house.

One commonality between countries is that the family occupying the great house were outnumbered, often greatly so, by their staff. There was often an elaborate hierarchy among domestic workers, probably most familiar to people today through television dramas such as Downton Abbey.

As in the past, today's great houses are limited to heads of state, the very rich, or those who have inherited them; few in the developed world are staffed at the level of past centuries. Nowadays, the International Guild of Butlers estimates that the annual salaries of a 20–25 person household staff total in excess of US$1,000,000.

Management
On large estates or in families with more than one residence, there may be a steward (or the modern equivalent, an estate manager) who oversees direction of the entire establishment. Today, it is not uncommon for a couple to split the duties of management between them.

The head of the household is not the butler, but the house manager. An estate manager manages more than one property, and usually has financial and managerial background.

Practices vary depending on the size of the household and the preference of the employers, but in general the staff is divided into departments run by the following staff:

Support household staff
Sources:

For the master of the house:

 Valet (Gentleman's gentleman)

For the lady of the house:

 Companion
 Lady's maid

For the children:

 Governess
 Nanny
 Tutor
For needs of the household:
 Chauffeur

Junior household staff
Sources:

 Footman
 Hall boy
 Useful Man (also called houseman)
 Boot boy
 Maid (see Types of maid)
 Between staff or Between maids (also called Hall girl, particularly in the US)
 Chambermaid
 Housemaid
 Kitchen maid
 Laundry maid
 Nursemaid
 Parlourmaid
 Scullery maid
 Still room maid
 Page
 Seamstress

Grounds staff
An estate manager may have charge of the maintenance and care of the grounds, landscaping, and outbuildings (pool, cabana, stables, greenhouse etc.) which is divided into departments run by the:

Support grounds staff
Gardeners
Groundskeepers
Stablehands
Handyman

Notable great houses

 Belcourt Castle
 Boldt Castle
 Biltmore Estate
 The Breakers
 Burghley House
Cheshunt Great House
 Eaton Hall (Cheshire)
 The Elms
 Hatfield House
 Hearst Castle
 Hillwood
 Holkham Hall
 Hyde Park
The Great House at Leyton
 Lyndhurst
 Mansion House, London
 Marble House
 Moore Hall, County Mayo
 Moszna
 Rosecliff
 Rose Hall
 Syon House
 Westbury House
 White House
 Woburn Abbey

Depictions of great houses
The complex hierarchy of a staff in a great house has been portrayed in several notable productions for film and television.  Among these are:

 Backstairs at the White House
 Brideshead Revisited
 Downton Abbey, ITV television series filmed at Highclere Castle, a real-life Great House 
 The Edwardian Country House
 The Gilded Age
 Gosford Park Rebecca
 The Remains of the Day
 Upstairs, Downstairs
 You Rang, M'Lord?''

See also 

 Real estate
 House society
 Master of the Horse, a courtier, i.e. a royal appointment, now only ceremonial
 Master of the Hounds, in charge of and financially responsible for a hunt, usually a foxhunt

Notes

External links
 The Domestic Staff Citizen

Domestic work
House styles
House types
Dwellings of the Pueblo peoples